Munchy Food Industries Sdn Bhd (doing business as Munchy's) is a Malaysia-based snack food manufacturer with presence in over 60 countries around the world. Its group headquarters is in Batu Pahat and its corporate headquarters is in Klang. Munchy's has offices in Ipoh, Butterworth, Johor Bahru, Kota Bharu, Kuantan, Malacca City, Kota Kinabalu, Kuching and international offices in Singapore and Thailand.

History

Establishment
Munchy's started in 1991, in a small town in the South of Malaysia, Batu Pahat. The Munchy's origins started with the two brothers SK Tan and LK Tan setting up Munchy Food Industries.  With an initial investment of RM80,000 the brothers developed the company to its current state, with the involvement of their siblings, CK Tan and Net Tan.

Munchy's production capacity increased by the year as the brothers worked towards their goal to market Munchy's globally. The first destination for international expansion was South Africa. Subsequently, the brothers established a partnership with a reputable MNC chocolate company that allowed them to extend Munchy's product range to include chocolate wafers.

International expansion
Considered the most advanced fully automatic wafer plant in South East Asia to date, three new products were revealed – Muzic Wafers, Munchini Wafer Rolls and Lexus Biscuits.

Today, Munchy's owns a production plant and warehouse facility in Batu Pahat, Johor, Malaysia.
 2 wafer plants with the capacity to manufacture up to 410 tons per month.
 4 biscuit plants with production capacity up to 2,940 tons per month.
 5 wafer stick machines with 20 production lines with production capacity up to 280 tons per month.

A  warehouse was commissioned to be built. Munchy's had more recently adopted a new third-party logistics provider to enable its business to be executed with "Speed to Market" distribution.

All Munchy's products are manufactured solely under the brand name of Munchy's, with a record of 80 SKUs (Stock-Keeping Units) under their belt. The main product offerings for Munchy's are Krunch, Muzic, Munchy's, Lexus and Captain Munch.

1997 saw the introduction of MunchWorld Marketing Sdn Bhd, Munchy's marketing arm and sole distributor of Munchy's products. This entity was set up to spearhead Munchy's branding, marketing, advertising, events, promotions and distribution.

In 2021, Universal Robina of the Philippines acquired Munchy's for 1.925 billion Malaysian Ringgit.

Operations
Munchy Food Industries Sdn Bhd remains the manufacturing and group headquarters for the Munchy's brand. Munchy's maintains branches in Ipoh, Butterworth, Johor Bahru, Kota Bharu, Kuantan, Malacca City, Kota Kinabalu, Kuching and international offices in Singapore, Thailand and Indonesia.

MunchWorld Marketing Sdn Bhd, was established as Munchy's marketing arm and sole distributor of Munchy's products.

Product availability

 India
 Bangladesh
 Hong Kong
 Indonesia
 Iraq
 Libya
 Mauritius
 Nepal
 Singapore
 South Africa
 South Korea
 Thailand
 Brunei
 Taiwan
 Bahrain
 Mongolia
 Yemen
 Philippines
 Malaysia
 United Kingdom
 China

Brands
 Captain Munch
 Oat Krunch
 Biskies
 Lexus
 Muzic
 Yosss
 Munchy's Wheat Crackers
 Munchy's Choc Sandwich
 Munchy's Funmix
 Munchy's Original Cream Crackers
 Munchy's Marie
 Munchy's Topmix
 Bear Brand
 Tae

References

External links

 

Malaysian subsidiaries of foreign companies
Malaysian brands
Food and drink companies of Malaysia
Food and drink companies established in 1991
Malaysian companies established in 1991